Spider Smile is the seventh full-length release by Tarwater, an electronic music group from Berlin, Germany. The album debuted in May 2007.

Track listing
 "Shirley Temple"
 "World of Things to Touch"
 "Witchpark"
 "A Marriage in Belmont"
 "Lower Manhattan Pantoum"
 "Roderick Usher"
 "Arkestra"
 "When Love Was the Law in Los Angeles"
 "Easy Sermon "
 "Sweethome Under White Clouds"
 "When Tomorrow Comes"

References

2007 albums
Tarwater (band) albums
Morr Music albums